The 1928 Ohio gubernatorial election was held on November 6, 1928. Republican nominee Myers Y. Cooper defeated Democratic nominee Martin L. Davey with 54.79% of the vote.

General election

Candidates
Major party candidates
Myers Y. Cooper, Republican 
Martin L. Davey, Democratic

Other candidates
Joseph Sharts, Socialist
William Patterson, Workers
John D. Goerke, Socialist Labor
Frank W. Stanton, Prohibition

Results

References

1928
Ohio
Gubernatorial